Oulujärvi or Lake Oulu or Ule, is a large lake in the Kainuu region of Finland. It is also historically known as Lake Cajania from a former name of Kainuu. With an area of  it is the fifth largest lake in the country. The lake is drained by the Oulu River, which flows northwestward from the lake into the Gulf of Bothnia. Its nickname is the "Kainuu Sea", and it is bordered by the three municipalities of Vaala, Paltamo, and Kajaani. About 40 percent of the lake is in Vaala.

See also
Mulkkusaaret

References

External links

Oulujarvi, Official tourism website
Järviwiki Web Service 

 
Oulujoki basin
Landforms of Kainuu